Roger Haroldo Rodas Melgar (29 May 1946 – 14 June  2020) was a Guatemalan economist, politician and diplomat.

Biography
He served as the foreign affairs minister in the cabinet of President Álvaro Colom, from 14 January 2008 to 14 January 2012. He was the only minister in the Colom administration who served out the entire four-year term. He had previously served as vice-minister for foreign affairs from 1 January 1991 to 30 June 1992.

Rodas studied economics at the Universidad de San Carlos de Guatemala and a master's in international economics at the Graduate Institute of International Studies in Geneva, Switzerland. Prior to being appointed foreign minister, he had been the Secretary General of the Secretariat for Central American Economic Integration (SIECA)  since April 1995.

He also held positions with the United Nations Development Programme, the Inter-American Development Bank, the Union of Banana Exporting Countries, the Organization of American States, and the General Agreement on Tariffs and Trade. 

Rodas died from COVID-19 on 14 June 2020, during the COVID-19 pandemic in Guatemala. He was 74, sixteen days short of his 75th birthday.

Honors
 Order of Brilliant Star with Grand Cordon (Republic of China, 2008)

References

External links
 Haroldo Rodas Melgar's CV (Ministry of Foreign Affairs of Guatemala)

1946 births
Foreign ministers of Guatemala
2020 deaths
Universidad de San Carlos de Guatemala alumni
Graduate Institute of International and Development Studies alumni
Recipients of the Order of Brilliant Star
Deaths from the COVID-19 pandemic in Guatemala